Senator Díaz may refer to:

Antonio Soto Díaz (1949–2016), Senate of Puerto Rico
Carlos Díaz (politician) (born 1970), Senate of Puerto Rico
José J. Benítez Díaz (1866–1947), Senate of Puerto Rico
José Ramón Díaz (born 1973), Senate of Puerto Rico
Manny Díaz Jr. (born 1973), Florida State Senate
Rubén Díaz Sr. (born 1943), New York State Senate

See also
Lincoln Díaz-Balart (born 1954), Florida State Senate
Mario Díaz-Balart (born 1961), Florida State Senate
Senator Díaz de la Portilla (disambiguation)